Qaleh-ye Fereydun or Qaleh-e Fereydun or Qaleh Fereydun may refer to:
 Qaleh-ye Fereydun, Chaharmahal and Bakhtiari